Back Bone was a French aircraft manufacturer based in Tallard and founded by Thierry Simonet. The company specialized in the design and manufacture of paramotors in the form of ready-to-fly aircraft for the US FAR 103 Ultralight Vehicles rules and the European microlight regulations.

The company was active in the mid-2000s, but seems to have gone out of business by 2015.

The company produced a line of paramotors that included the Seraph, Shadow and Silver models.

Aircraft

References

Defunct aircraft manufacturers of France
Ultralight aircraft
Paramotors